Up First is a daily news podcast by the American media organization NPR, which releases an episode every weekday at 6 a.m. ET, and Saturdays and Sundays by 8 a.m ET. Up First gives a brief overview of each news item in its weekday and Saturday episodes, unlike some of NPR's other popular news podcasts which provide a deep exploration of each story. The Sunday edition of the podcast varies between originally produced content for the feed and showcasing previously published episodes for NPR's various long-form journalism podcasts. 

The podcast was launched on April 5, 2017 in order to showcase the most prominent stories of the day in a digestible format, and giving hosts the opportunity to discuss current news items with experts. The podcast's weekday edition is hosted by Morning Edition hosts A Martínez, Steve Inskeep, and Leila Fadel. The podcast expanded to a Saturday edition on November 9, 2019, and is hosted by Weekend Edition Saturday host Scott Simon alongside Weekend Edition Sunday host Ayesha Rascoe. Beginning on January 9, 2022, the podcast expanded to a Sunday edition hosted by Rachel Martin, offering extended content in each episode to provide context behind current headlines.

Format 
When Up First launched, it was intended to be a spin off of the popular NPR show Morning Edition, a morning news show that runs for several hours each weekday on NPR. For many people, Morning Edition was inaccessible due to its length or the time in which it aired. For this reason, Up First was introduced to cater to the "more than three-fourths of NPR podcast listeners [who] say they are “definitely” interested in short, daily audio news updates." 

Up First was NPR's solution to delivering the most broad overview of the show for the day, as many fans of Morning Edition didn't have the hours to dedicate to listening to the long show. After Morning Edition first goes live at 5 am ET, NPR takes its first 10 minutes or so with its hosts, and edits that into the show that many know best as Up First. When the Morning Edition broadcast picks up again at 7 am ET, the first ten minutes of the broadcast are replaced with something new to keep the information fresh and not repetitive.

Competition with The Daily 
Though Up First is often compared to The New York Times''' daily news podcast The Daily, the two podcasts have differences in how they are formatted. The Daily, a 20-25 minute podcast, favors an in-depth look at a single story. Meanwhile, NPR's Up First clocks in closer to 15 minutes each day trying to make the day's biggest news stories as accessible and digestible as possible, typically over three to four segments in each episode. That being said, polls and critics have been shown to favor The Daily over Up First.Up First'' is available to listen to on the NPR website, NPR One, and anywhere else NPR podcasts are posted.

See also 
 List of daily news podcasts

References

NPR programs
Audio podcasts

2017 podcast debuts
News podcasts